The 2019 Caribbean Club Championship was the 21st edition of the Caribbean Club Championship (also known as the CFU Club Championship), the first-tier annual international club football competition in the Caribbean region, held amongst clubs whose football associations are affiliated with the Caribbean Football Union (CFU), a sub-confederation of CONCACAF. The tournament was played in Jamaica between 12–19 May 2019.

Atlético Pantoja were the title holders, but did not compete in this season's CONCACAF Caribbean Club Championship. Portmore United were crowned Caribbean club champions for the second time and qualified for the 2020 CONCACAF Champions League. Runners-up Waterhouse and third place Capoise qualified for the 2019 CONCACAF League, but fourth-placed Real Hope lost to 2019 Caribbean Club Shield winners Robinhood in a playoff and failed to qualify for the CONCACAF League.

Teams

Among the 31 CFU member associations, four of them were classified as professional leagues and each may enter two teams in the CONCACAF Caribbean Club Championship. However, two associations were not allowed to enter this season, and as a result, only four teams from two associations entered the 2019 CONCACAF Caribbean Club Championship (officially the 2019 Flow CONCACAF Caribbean Club Championship for sponsorship reasons).

Associations not allowed to enter

The two teams from the Dominican Republic, Cibao (2018 Liga Dominicana de Fútbol championship playoffs champions) and Atlético de San Francisco (2018 Liga Dominicana de Fútbol regular season winners), were not allowed to compete in the 2019 CONCACAF Caribbean Club Championship as the association did not register them on time.

The two teams from Trinidad and Tobago, North East Stars (2017 TT Pro League champions) and W Connection (2017 TT Pro League runners-up), were not allowed to compete in the 2019 CONCACAF Caribbean Club Championship as the association did not properly execute its club licensing programme.

Venue
The matches were played at the Stadium East in Kingston.

Match officials

Referees
Reon Radix (Grenada) 
Keylor Herrera (Costa Rica) 
Randy Encarnacion (Dominican Republic) 
José Raul Torres Rivera (Puerto Rico) 

Assistant Referees
Iroots Appleton (Antigua and Barbuda) 
Kevon Clarke (Barbados) 
Ronald Bruña (Panama) 
Yordanis Gomez (Cuba)
Oscar Mitchell-Carvalho (Canada)

Squads

Matches
All times local, EST (UTC−5).

CONCACAF League playoff
The CONCACAF League playoff was played between the 2019 CONCACAF Caribbean Club Championship fourth-placed team, Real Hope, and the 2019 CONCACAF Caribbean Club Shield winners, Robinhood, with the winners qualifying for the 2019 CONCACAF League preliminary round.

Top goalscorers

See also
2019 Caribbean Club Shield
2019 CONCACAF League
2020 CONCACAF Champions League

References

External links
Caribbean Club Championship, CONCACAF.com
CFU Club Championship, CFUfootball.org

2019
1
2019 CONCACAF League
2020 CONCACAF Champions League
May 2019 sports events in North America
International association football competitions hosted by Jamaica